Ken Weaver (born February 10, 1956) is a former stock car racing driver and team owner from Dallas, Texas. He drove the No. 20 PhoneCo – Industrial Lightspeed Chevrolet in the ARCA stock car series. He ran in NASCAR in 2004 and 2005, before returning to ARCA.

Craftsman Truck Series career
Weaver has 24 career starts in the Truck Series. Running his No. 20 PhoneCo Chevy, Weaver made his debut in the 2003 race at Mesa Marin Raceway. It was a decent first race, as Weaver started 26th and finished 29th.

Those runs earned him a new ride in 2004, driving a Green Light Racing No. 08 Chevy, with funding from PhoneCo. He had a best of 18th at Texas and by midseason, Weaver was scaled back to a limited schedule.

Weaver continued to race in the trucks in 2005. This time at Daytona, he scored his first top-ten finish a 6th at Daytona. Weaver made three more races in 2005. He did not finish two of the three races, and his best finish was a 28th at Atlanta Motor Speedway.

ARCA career
Weaver began racing in the ARCA Re/Max Series in 2002. In 2005 and 2006, after modest results to start his career, his performance significantly, highlighted by 15 top 10s and four 2nd-place finishes in 2005. He drove the No. 20 PhoneCo Dodge for the 2006 season.

Business career
Weaver purchased Freedom Power Electric in 2006 which provides pre-paid electricity to Texas consumers with credit problems. During August 2009, he transferred his ownership to an irrevocable trust controlled by his ex-wife after it was exposed by the Dallas Morning News  that he had a criminal past that he failed to disclose on his initial application with the Texas Public Utilities Commission, a fact that could have affected his ability to purchase the regulated company.  It was also discovered that while he claimed to have dual Bachelor degrees from the University of North Texas, he actually had only taken a few classes and dropped out, never obtaining a degree from any university.

Motorsports career results

NASCAR
(key) (Bold – Pole position awarded by qualifying time. Italics – Pole position earned by points standings or practice time. * – Most laps led.)

Craftsman Truck Series

Winston West Series

ARCA Re/Max Series
(key) (Bold – Pole position awarded by qualifying time. Italics – Pole position earned by points standings or practice time. * – Most laps led.)

References

External links
 
 

1956 births
ARCA Menards Series drivers
Living people
NASCAR drivers
American male criminals
Racing drivers from Dallas